This article is about the demographic features of Nigeriens, the people of Niger, including population density, ethnicity, education level, health of the populace, economic status, religious affiliations and other aspects of the population.

The largest ethnic groups in Niger are the Hausa, who also constitute the major ethnic group in northern Nigeria, and the Zarma Songhai (also spelled Djerma-Songhai), who also are found in parts of Mali. Both groups are sedentary farmers who live in the arable, southern tier. The Kanouri (including Beri Beri, Manga) make up the majority of sedentary population in the far southeast of the nation. The remainder of the Nigerien people are nomadic or seminomadic livestock-raising peoples—Tuareg, Fulani, Toubou and Diffa Arabs. With rapidly growing populations and the consequent competition for meager natural resources, lifestyles of these two types of peoples have come increasingly into conflict in Niger in recent years. Some white French people live in the country due to Niger being a former colony of France.

Niger's high infant mortality rate is comparable to levels recorded in neighboring countries. However, the child mortality rate (deaths among children between the ages of 1 and 4) is exceptionally high (274 per 1,000) due to generally poor health conditions and inadequate nutrition for most of the country's children. Niger's very high total fertility rate (6.89 children born per woman, which is the highest in the world), nonetheless, means that nearly half (49%) of the Nigerien population is under age 15. School attendance is low (34%), including 38% of males and 27% of females. Additional education occurs through Koranic schools.

Population

Source: Institut National de la Statistique - Niger

Census results

UN estimates

The proportion of children and teenagers below the age of 15 in 2010 was 49%, 48.8% was between 15 and 65 years of age, while only 2.2% was 65 years or older.

Population Estimates by Sex and Age Group (01.VII.2017):

Vital statistics 
Registration of vital events in Niger is incomplete. The website Our World in Data prepared the following estimates based on statistics from the Population Department of the United Nations.

Fertility and births 
Total fertility rate (TFR; Wanted Fertility Rate) and crude birth rate (CBR):

Fertility data as of 2012 (DHS Program):

Ethnic groups

Core health indicators

Other demographic statistics 
Demographic statistics according to the World Population Review in 2022.

One birth every 27 seconds	
One death every 3 minutes	
One net migrant every 360 minutes	
Net gain of one person every 33 seconds

The following demographic are from the CIA World Factbook unless otherwise indicated.

Population
24,484,587 (2022 est.)
19,866,231 (July 2018 est.)

Religions
Muslim 99.3%, Christian 0.3%, animist 0.2%, none 0.1% (2012 est.)

Age structure

0-14 years: 50.58% (male 5,805,102/female 5,713,815)
15-24 years: 19.99% (male 2,246,670/female 2,306,285)
25-54 years: 23.57% (male 2,582,123/female 2,784,464)
55-64 years: 3.17% (male 357,832/female 364,774)
65 years and over: 2.68% (male 293,430/female 317,866) (2020 est.)

0-14 years: 48.68% (male 4,878,031 /female 4,793,021)
15-24 years: 19.36% (male 1,899,879 /female 1,945,806)
25-54 years: 26.02% (male 2,581,597 /female 2,587,913)
55-64 years: 3.3% (male 340,032 /female 315,142)
65 years and over: 2.64% (male 268,072 /female 256,738) (2018 est.)

Birth rate
47.08 births/1,000 population (2022 est.) Country comparison to the world: 1st
43.6 births/1,000 population (2018 est.) Country comparison to the world: 2nd

Death rate
9.87 deaths/1,000 population (2022 est.) Country comparison to the world: 37th
11.5 deaths/1,000 population (2018 est.)

Total fertility rate
6.2 children born/woman (2021 est.) Country comparison to the world: 1st
6.35 children born/woman (2018 est.) Country comparison to the world: 1st

Median age
total: 14.8 years. Country comparison to the world: 227th
male: 14.5 years
female: 15.1 years (2020 est.)

total: 15.5 years. Country comparison to the world: 228th
male: 15.4 years 
female: 15.7 years (2018 est.)

Population growth rate
3.66% (2022 est.) Country comparison to the world: 3rd
3.16% (2018 est.) Country comparison to the world: 7th

Mother's mean age at first birth
20.4 years (2012 est.)
note: median age at first birth among women 25-49

Contraceptive prevalence rate
11% (2017/18)

Net migration rate
-0.64 migrant(s)/1,000 population (2022 est.) Country comparison to the world: 129th
-0.5 migrant(s)/1,000 population (2017 est.) Country comparison to the world: 125th

Dependency ratios
total dependency ratio: 111.6 (2015 est.)
youth dependency ratio: 106.2 (2015 est.)
elderly dependency ratio: 5.4 (2015 est.)
potential support ratio: 18.6 (2015 est.)

Urbanization
urban population: 16.9% of total population (2022)
rate of urbanization: 4.72% annual rate of change (2020-25 est.)

urban population: 16.4% of total population (2018)
rate of urbanization: 4.27% annual rate of change (2015-20 est.)

Sex ratio
at birth:
1.03 male(s)/female
younger than 15 years:
1.02 male(s)/female
15–64 years:
0.99 male(s)/female
65 years and over:
0.8 male(s)/female
total population:
1 male(s)/female (2010 est.)

Life expectancy at birth

total population: 60.09 years. Country comparison to the world: 218th
male: 58.55 years
female: 61.68 years (2022 est.)

total population: 56.3 years (2018 est.)
male: 55 years (2018 est.)
female: 57.7 years (2018 est.)

total population: 52.6 years
male: 51.39 years
female: 53.85 years (2010 est.)

Major infectious diseases
degree of risk: very high (2020)
food or waterborne diseases: bacterial and protozoal diarrhea, hepatitis A, and typhoid fever
vectorborne diseases: malaria and dengue fever
water contact diseases: schistosomiasis
animal contact diseases: rabies
respiratory diseases: meningococcal meningitis

note: on 21 March 2022, the US Centers for Disease Control and Prevention (CDC) issued a Travel Alert for polio in Africa; Niger is currently considered a high risk to travelers for circulating vaccine-derived polioviruses (cVDPV); vaccine-derived poliovirus (VDPV) is a strain of the weakened poliovirus that was initially included in oral polio vaccine (OPV) and that has changed over time and behaves more like the wild or naturally occurring virus; this means it can be spread more easily to people who are unvaccinated against polio and who come in contact with the stool or respiratory secretions, such as from a sneeze, of an “infected” person who received oral polio vaccine; the CDC recommends that before any international travel, anyone unvaccinated, incompletely vaccinated, or with an unknown polio vaccination status should complete the routine polio vaccine series; before travel to any high-risk destination, CDC recommends that adults who previously completed the full, routine polio vaccine series receive a single, lifetime booster dose of polio vaccine

Education expenditures
3.5% of GDP (2019) Country comparison to the world: 126th

Literacy
definition: age 15 and over can read and write 
total population: 35.1%
male: 43.6%
female: 26.7% (2018)

total population: 19.1% (2015 est.)
male: 27.3% (2015 est.)
female: 11% (2015 est.)

Total population: 28.7% (2004 est.; source: UNDP 2006; NB- this figure is given without reference to which languages are considered)
Male: 42.9%
Female: 15.1%

Nationality
noun:
Nigerien(s)
adjective:
Nigerien

Ethnic Groups
 Hausa 53.1%
 Zarma/Songhai 21.2%
 Tuareg 11%
 Fulani 6.5%
 Kanuri 5.9%
 Gurma 0.8%
 Arab 0.4%
 Tubu 0.4%
 Other/Unavailable 0.9% (2006 est.)

Languages

French (official)
Hausa
Zarma (Djerma)

School life expectancy (primary to tertiary education)
total: 6 years (2017)
male: 7 years (2017)
female: 6 years (2017)

Unemployment, youth ages 15-24
total: 16.6%
male: 16.1%
female: 17.5% (2017 est.)

See also 
 Seasonal migration in Niger
Women in Niger
LGBT rights in Niger

References

UNDP. 2006. Beyond scarcity: Power, poverty and the global water crisis. Human Development Report 2006. New York: United Nations Development Programme (UNDP). 
UNDP The Human Development Index reports: Niger.
Health Organization Niger overview.  Includes links to statistics, programs and news on health and demography in Niger.
WHO "Country Logbook" for Niger. Providing Surveys, Censuses, Monitoring of vital events, Health services & surveillance, Health situation & trend analysis, and Planning & strategic documents .
ethnologue.com: Ethnic and linguistic breakdown for Niger.
OECD/  AEO 2007 Niger country study.
The AGRHYMET Regional Centre (ARC), Niamey Office . Institute of the Permanent Interstate Committee for Drought Control in the Sahel (CILSS) composed of nine member States, including Niger. 
The World Bank, Niger overview and resources.

 
Society of Niger